Tomomi Kawata (born 30 June 1998) is a Japanese handball player for Hokkoku Bank and the Japanese national team.

She represented Japan at the 2019 World Women's Handball Championship.

References

1998 births
Living people
Japanese female handball players
Handball players at the 2018 Asian Games
Asian Games bronze medalists for Japan
Asian Games medalists in handball
Medalists at the 2018 Asian Games
20th-century Japanese women
21st-century Japanese women